Yangshuo County is a county under the jurisdiction of Guilin City, in the northeast of Guangxi, China. Its seat is located in Yangshuo Town. Surrounded by karst peaks and bordered on one side by the Li River it is easily accessible by bus or by boat from nearby Guilin.

History

In the 1980s, the county became popular with foreign visitors engaging in backpacker tourism, and organized tours began by the late 1990s. At the time, domestic tourists represented only a small fraction, but they soon outnumbered foreign tourists by a greater margin in 2005. Today, the county is a resort destination for both domestic and foreign travelers.

The history of West Street dates back over 1,400 years ago. Since the street is popular with locals and foreigners alike, signs are written in both Chinese and English. Because of the relatively high number of foreign visitors, many locals speak some English unlike most Chinese towns of its size.

The Yangshuo region has numerous locations for climbing, most easily accessible by bicycle, public bus, or taxi van. The most famous of these crags is Moon Hill with several lines graded 5.13 in the Yosemite scale. Other crags of note include Low Mountain, Twin Gates, Baby Frog, the Egg, Bamboo Grove, and Wine Bottle Cliff.

Climate

Landmarks

Li River
Moon Hill
Yulong River
Silver Cave

See also
Baisha, Yangshuo County
Putao, Guangxi
Puyi Township, Guangxi

Sister cities
Yangshuo has city partnerships with the following cities and/or regions:
Morehead, Kentucky, United States (1994)
Rapid City, South Dakota, United States (2000)
Bled, Upper Carniola, Slovenia (2009)
Annecy-le-Vieux, Haute Savoie, France (2011)

References

External links

Official website of Yangshuo County

 
Administrative divisions of Guilin
Counties of Guangxi